Parotis punctiferalis is a moth in the family Crambidae. It was described by Francis Walker in 1866. It is found in New Guinea, Australia and China.

The wingspan is 36–37 mm.

The larvae feed on Apocynaceae species, including Melodinus species.

References

External links
 Lateral view of a male Parotis sp., moth, probably P. punctiferalis at  hongkongnaturewalk.tumblr.com

Moths described in 1866
Spilomelinae